This page lists board and card games, wargames, miniatures games, and tabletop role-playing games published in 2014.  For video games, see 2014 in video gaming.

Games released or invented in 2014

Game awards given in 2014
Spiel des Jahres: Camel Up
Kennerspiel des Jahres: Istanbul
Kinderspiel des Jahres: Geister, Geister, Schatzsuchmeister! 
Deutscher Spiele Preis: Russian Railroads
Games: Garden Dice/The Card Expansion
 Nations won the Spiel Portugal Jogo do Ano.

Significant games-related events in 2014
Days of Wonder merges with Asmodée Éditions
Fantasy Flight Games merges with Asmodée Éditions

Deaths

See also
List of game manufacturers
2014 in video gaming

References

Games
Games by year